NA-148 Multan-I is a constituency for the National Assembly of Pakistan.

Election 2002 

General elections were held on 10 Oct 2002. Sikandar Bosan of PML-Q won by 47,368 votes.

Election 2008 

General elections were held on 18 Feb 2008. Syed Yousaf Raza Gillani of PPP won by 77,664.

Election 2013

Election 2018

See also
NA-147 Khanewal-IV
NA-149 Multan-II

References

External links 
Election result's official website

Constituencies of Punjab, Pakistan